David (Dafydd) Edward Lewis (7 March 1866 – 17 August 1941) was a Welsh businessman and philanthropist.

Lewis was born in Llanrhystud near Aberystwyth, Cardiganshire, Wales, the son of David Lewis, a farmer, and his wife Catherine, née Mason.

Lewis migrated to Melbourne, Australia, in 1890; opening a drapery shop in 1902 which became a successful business. In 1928 he donated £2000 to the engineering school of the University of Melbourne for laboratory extensions.

After his death, his will established the Dafydd Lewis Trust, with a £700,000 endowment. This provided scholarships for full-time degree courses (other than in theology, arts, music or education) at the University of Melbourne for boys from Victorian state schools whose parents could not afford to pay for a university education.

References

External links

Dafydd Lewis Trust retrieved 5 September 2010

1866 births
1941 deaths
Australian philanthropists
People from Ceredigion